Si is a concept in Chinese philosophy that is usually translated as "reflection" or "concentration." It refers to a species of attentive, non-rational thought that is directed at a specific subject.

References 

Philosophy of mind
Concepts in Chinese philosophy
Attention